Murska Sobota railway station serves the municipality of Murska Sobota, Slovenia. It was opened in 1924.

On 29 January 2010, the first Holocaust memorial in Slovenia was unveiled at the station. It is dedicated to the memory of the once-significant Jewish community of the Prekmurje region. The members of the community were arrested by the Hungarian authorities in 1944 and transported to Hungary proper and Croatia, from which they were then deported to the Auschwitz concentration camp in Nazi Germany.

References

External links 

Official site of the Slovenian railways 

Railway stations in Slovenia
Railway stations opened in 1924
railway station